Uptown Girl (stylized in all caps) is the first extended play of South Korean rapper Mirani. It was released on November 30, 2021, through Area.

Background 
Prior to the release of the EP, Mirani explained why she named it "Uptown Girl".

Music and lyrics 
"Tikita" features a smooth R&B beat and an addictive chorus, but does not satisfy those who expected Mirani's first EP to be bolder.

Singles 
"Lambo!" was released on November 10, 2021. It charted at number 92 on the Gaon Download Chart.

Critical reception 
Lee Hong-hyeon of IZM rated Uptown Girl 3 out of 5 stars.

Lim Dong-yeop of IZM rated "Lambo!" 3.5 out of 5 stars.

Track listing

Charts

References 

2021 debut EPs
Korean-language EPs